Rosalie Bradford (August 27, 1943 – November 29, 2006) was an American woman who held the Guinness World Record as the world's heaviest woman.

Weight gain
In her early twenties she met a man whom she married. The couple eventually had a son. Bradford found herself staying home with their son and cooking a lot. Her weight continued to accelerate uncontrollably, as did her appetite. She eventually tried several diets and joined Weight Watchers with little success.

Finally, after a blood infection landed her in the hospital, Bradford gave up on exercise altogether when the necessary bed rest allowed for her weight gain to accelerate. She remained immobile for eight years. In 1988, she became so depressed and frustrated that she attempted to commit suicide with painkillers, although, due to her weight, these only made her sleep for a couple of days.

Weight loss
A concerned friend contacted Richard Simmons, a familiar face in the weight-loss industry. Simmons then contacted Bradford and spoke to her at length. She recalled Simmons saying “God doesn’t make junk and you are worth the effort.” After the phone call she received a package from him containing some exercise tapes and an eating plan.

Bradford started small by clapping her hands along to the videos. "It was the only movement I could do," she explained. She focused on her diet and stuck to Simmons’ plan. After a year she had dropped . The lymphatic system in her legs was damaged in one of five surgeries to remove excess skin left by her weight loss.

Bradford appeared on the Channel 4 television programme BodyShock giving advice to Patrick Deuel. The episode was first broadcast in August 2007.

Death
Rosalie Bradford died on November 29, 2006 at a hospital in Lakeland (near her Auburndale, Florida home). She was 63 years old, and was survived by her husband Bob Bradford and son Robbie. She lost the world record of having lost the most weight by a woman to Mayra Rosales in 2013.

Statistics
 Weight: 1200 pounds (544 kg)
 BMI: 193
 Height: 5 foot 6 inches (1.68 m)

Sources

See also

 List of the heaviest people
 Obesity

1943 births
2006 deaths
People from Auburndale, Florida